Maxence Melo Mubyazi (Born in 1977) is an investigative journalist and the owner and co-founder of a popular East and Central African platform and discussion forum, especially for whistleblowers in Tanzania. He was awarded 2019 with the CPJ International Press Freedom Award and the Gwen Ifill Press Freedom Award being awarded by the Committee to Protect Journalists. His website hosts frank debates, mostly in Kiswahili, about topics that include graft in the public sector and government incompetence.

He and his website became famous in 2007 with a story about corruption in the Central Bank of Tanzania. Millions of dollars were missing from the bank. His website office was raided 2016 by Tanzanian security forces, he was detained 8 days for interrogation. Afterwards, he was charged with managing a domain not registered in Tanzania. 2017 Mubyazi had to appear in court 81 times. The cases restrict him from traveling beyond the city of Dar es Salaam.

After being awarded with the CPJ International Press Freedom Award the US Embassy in Tanzania explicitly congratulated him.

References 

Living people
Place of birth missing (living people)
Date of birth missing (living people)
Tanzanian human rights activists
Tanzanian journalists
1977 births